Crateva is a genus of flowering plants in the caper family, Capparaceae.

Species
Accepted species include:

 Crateva adansonii DC.
 Crateva excelsa Bojer
 Crateva greveana Baill.	
 Crateva humblotii (Baill.) Hadj-Moust.
 Crateva hygrophila Kurz
 Crateva magna (Lour.) DC.
 Crateva nurvala Buch.-Ham.
 Crateva obovata J.Vahl
 Crateva palmeri Rose	
 Crateva religiosa G.Forst.
 Crateva simplicifolia J.S.Mill.	
 Crateva speciosa Volkens
 Crateva suaresensis Baill.
 Crateva tapia L.
 Crateva unilocularis Buch.-Ham.	
 Crateva urbaniana R.Rankin
 Crateva yarinacochaensis Cornejo & Iltis

Formerly placed here
Aegiceras corniculatum (L.) Blanco (as C. corniculatum (L.) L.)
Aegle marmelos (L.) Corrêa (as C. marmelos L.)

References

External links

Capparaceae